The Buriram Marathon is held every February at the Chang International Circuit in Buriram, northeastern Thailand. Its title sponsor is Chang Beer. The marathon events are regularly attended by elite runners from Thailand, Laos, Ethiopia, Kenya, and other countries.

History 
The Buriram Marathon was founded by Newin Chidchob, the President of Buriram United and Executive of Chang International Circuit.

The inaugural event was launched in 2017. More than 24,000 runners participated in the 3rd Buriram Marathon in 2019, which was marked by much higher than usual humidity and temperatures.

Past winners 
Key:

Marathon

Half marathon

10 km

References

External links 
Buriram Marathon official site

Marathons in Thailand